The Women's Suffrage Movement in the Western world influenced changes in female fashions of the early 1900s: causing the introduction of masculine silhouettes and the popular Flapper style.

Women's dress pre-women's suffrage 

The women of the late 19th century changed their style from the big Victorian dresses to more “manageable, practical, streamlined outfits for modern women to engage in the activities of their more active lives." Prior to the Women's Suffrage Movement, general consensus asserted that women were physically weaker than their male counterparts, so were discouraged from playing sports." Despite this, with an increasing number of women participating in protests, some experts in the medical field began to argue that light physical activity for a woman was good. Consequently, there was an increasing output of clothes to correspond, called rational dress. One specific piece of clothing was the sporting pantaloon or the women's bloomer; originally worn in America in the 1850s as a women's suffrage statement by Amelia Bloomer, it turned into the ideal costume for women riding bicycles - an activity that was considered acceptable for women to participate in during the late 19th century. This was deemed most appropriate for sports and outdoor activity, so marked the beginning of pants as a 'regular' piece of clothing .

Women's fashion during the women's suffrage movement 
In light of the First World War, women commenced employment in factories to aid the war effort, beginning in jobs that the men were no longer able to undertake, as they were serving in the front lines of the war. As a result, the dress reform began, a reform that saw  female activists argue  clothes should offer convenience, rather than comfort, so that they could do labour jobs more efficiently. Accordingly, fashion became less restrictive than the Victorian era dress and required less fabric to make, saving the much needed resources. An article written by Laura Doan states, the newly found freedom of women is considered to have been a catalyst for the commencement of women including more masculinised fashion and style in their own dress. However, as the war ended this trend was not entirely agreed upon as men did not fully accept the changing styles in women's fashion, and thus female fashion reverted to the traditional feminine style, conforming to the rigid beauty and social standards imposed on them at the time. All in all, typical female fashion actually remained very feminine (contrary to the societal standards of the time). Briefly summarised by this quote, “From society lady to factory "girl," every woman wore a hat, stockings, shoes, and gloves in all seasons.”

In accordance with the emerging modern woman, the New Woman's moxie was paradoxically evident in her lack of charm, exhibiting short bobbed haircuts, heavier makeup, and boyish frames. The flapper's simplistic, straight-lined style was popularized by Coco Chanel, who's somewhat ironically remembered as "fashionable without being forward," as a way of liberating women the impractical designs that hindered modern women's ability to engage in physical activities. "The newfound freedom to breathe and walk encouraged movement out of the house, and the Flapper took full advantage.”

Women's fashion post-women's suffrage movement (1920s–1930s) 
During the progressive era, female fashion in the United States changed shifted to adopt traditionally masculine styles. Pants became widespread, with female baseball players wearing knickers underneath their prescribed uniform. Other fashion trends included pearl jewellery and petite handbags, popularised by French designer Coco Chanel. French designs became extremely popular during this time, however, as there were very little shipments of these designs, only wealthy women were able to afford the pieces coming directly from France, and thus, magazines at the time capitalised on the popularity of French designs by selling sewing patterns mimicking these styles.

The popularisation of the flapper style was due to film, radio and the media. Adrian was a popular designer for Metro-Goldyn-Mayer during the 1920s-1930s, dressing silent film actresses including Clara Bow, Norma Shearer, Greta Garbo and Joan Crawford: which influenced American women's fashion. This style  exposed areas that were previously hidden on the woman, including the knees, as stockings were no longer compulsory. Flappers were also known for their "boyish" appearance, sporting a bobbed hairstyle, cloche hats and tubular garments including jumper-blouses, which hid the female figure. Waistlines of dresses were dropped and no longer required the use of corsetry, and thus the popular silhouette in female fashion, became "waistless, bustless, and hipless". Other popular accessory designs included the "strap bracelet" by Cartier and Miriam Haskell's "fashion jewellery". Not all flapper fashion was consistent, as hemlines of dresses changed each year: in 1923 gowns were almost floor length whilst in 1925 they became knee length.

The term flapper, initially described young, working-class women but overtime it was used to describe any young women who challenged the social standards. Zelda Fitzgerald, the wife of Modernist author F. Scott Fitzgerald, a writer and socialite, became a popular figure. Fitzgerald's novel, Save Me the Waltz (1932), popularised the sentiment that "a woman can do anything a man can do" without compromising femininity. However, this style was criticised as it became associated with the decline in female morality. The flapper became stereotyped as a woman who "smoked, drank, swore, drove fast, professed free love, and used makeup," and exercised sexual independence.

References 

20th-century fashion
Women's suffrage
Fashion
20th century in the United States
Feminism and history
Women in sports
Flappers